The 1981 Arkansas Razorbacks football team represented the University of Arkansas during the 1981 NCAA Division I-A football season. The biggest win of the year was against a #1 Texas team, which the Razorbacks were rivals with already. Although unranked, the Razorbacks came out on top by 31 points, ending Texas' run at the top of the polls. 

Unranked at the end of the regular season, the Hogs still received a Gator Bowl berth against a 10–2 North Carolina team ranked 11th. The SWC's champion, SMU, could not participate in a bowl game due to probation.

Defensive lineman Billy Ray Smith was a consensus All-American for Arkansas. Bruce Lahay, a kicker, also received first-team honors. Lahay was in a three-way tie for field goals per game in 1981, hitting on 1.73 per game. This mark was also held by Kevin Butler of Georgia and Larry Roach of Oklahoma State.

Schedule

Personnel

Season summary

Tulsa

Northwestern

at Ole Miss

at TCU

at Texas Tech

Texas

Houston

at Rice

Baylor

at Texas A&M

SMU

Gator Bowl (vs. North Carolina)

References

Arkansas
Arkansas Razorbacks football seasons
Arkansas Razorbacks football